So Good Together is the twenty-fourth studio album by American country music singer Reba McEntire. It was released in 1999 and was preceded by the single "What Do You Say". "What Do You Say" peaked at number 3 on the country singles chart and was nominated for a Grammy for Best Short Form Video. It also became her highest charting single on the Billboard Hot 100, peaking at number 31 and becoming her first big crossover hit. The album was certified platinum by the RIAA.

The album peaked at number 5 on the Billboard Top Country Albums chart and number 28 on the Billboard 200 with sales of 49,000 copies.

Track listing
North American version

International version

Personnel
Adapted from liner notes.

Tracks 1, 4, 8, 10
Richard "Spady" Brannon - bass guitar
Terry Crisp - steel guitar
Eric Darken - percussion
Larry Franklin - fiddle
Paul Franklin - steel guitar
Wes Hightower - background vocals
Jeff King - electric guitar
Paul Liem - drums
B. James Lowry - acoustic guitar
Liana Manis - background vocals
Brent Mason - electric guitar
Jerry McPherson - electric guitar
Reba McEntire - lead vocals, background vocals
Jimmy Nichols - keyboards, background vocals
Brent Rowan - electric guitar

Tracks 2, 3, 5, 11
Eddie Bayers - drums
Mark Casstevens - acoustic guitar
John Cowan - background vocals
Thom Flora - background vocals
Larry Franklin - fiddle
Paul Franklin - steel guitar
Steve Gibson - acoustic guitar, electric guitar
John Hobbs - synthesizer
Dann Huff - electric guitar
Ronn Huff - string arrangements, conductor
John Barlow Jarvis - keyboards, piano
Kim Keyes - background vocals
Paul Liem - drums
Reba McEntire - lead vocals
Steve Nathan - keyboards, piano
Michael Rhodes - bass guitar
John Wesley Ryles - background vocals
Steuart Smith - acoustic guitar, electric guitar
Harry Stinson - background vocals
Templeton Thompson - background vocals
Laura Vide - background vocals
Glenn Worf - bass guitar

Track 12
Eddie Bayers - drums
David Campbell - string arrangements, conductor
Mark Casstevens - acoustic guitar
Jose y Durval - featured vocals
John Hobbs - keyboards
John Barlow Jarvis - piano
Reba McEntire - lead vocals
Michael Rhodes - bass guitar
Steuart Smith - electric guitar, gut string guitar

Tracks 6, 7, 9
Eddie Bayers - drums 
Steve Dorff - string arrangements, conductor
Stuart Duncan - fiddle
Paul Franklin - steel guitar
Liana Manis - background vocals
Brent Mason - electric guitar
Reba McEntire - lead vocals
Gary Prim - keyboards, piano
John Wesley Ryles - background vocals
John Willis - acoustic guitar
Glenn Worf - bass guitar

Charts

Weekly charts

Year-end charts

Certifications

Singles

Other charted songs

References

1999 albums
Reba McEntire albums
MCA Records albums
Albums produced by Tony Brown (record producer)
Albums produced by David Malloy
Albums produced by Keith Stegall